The 1968 LPGA Tour was the 19th season since the LPGA Tour officially began in 1950. The season ran from March 14 to December 1. The season consisted of 32 official money events. Carol Mann and Kathy Whitworth won the most tournaments, 10 each. Whitworth led the money list with earnings of $48,379.

There were three first-time winners in 1968: Sandra Post, the first Canadian winner, Judy Rankin, and Peggy Wilson.

The tournament results and award winners are listed below.

Tournament results
The following table shows all the official money events for the 1968 season. "Date" is the ending date of the tournament. The numbers in parentheses after the winners' names are the number of wins they had on the tour up to and including that event. Majors are shown in bold.

Awards

References

External links
LPGA Tour official site
1968 season coverage at golfobserver.com

LPGA Tour seasons
LPGA Tour